The 1993 season was Shimizu S-Pulse's second season in existence and their first season in the newly established J1 League. The club also competed in the Emperor's Cup and the J.League Cup. The team finished the season third in the league.

Review and events

League results summary

League results by round

Competitions

Domestic results

J.League

Suntory series

NICOS series

Emperor's Cup

J.League Cup

Player statistics

 † player(s) joined the team after the opening of this season.

Transfers

In:

Out:

Transfers during the season

In
Hisashi Katō (from Verdy Kawasaki on July)
Gomes (from Atlético on July)
Sidmar (from XV de Piracicaba on July)
Marcão (on November)

Out
Marco Antonio (in January 1994)

Awards
J.League Rookie of the Year: Masaaki Sawanobori
J.League Best XI: Takumi Horiike

References

Other pages
 J. League official site
 Shimizu S-Pulse official site

Shimizu S-Pulse
Shimizu S-Pulse seasons